The 2009 Nehru Cup International Football Tournament also known as the ONGC Nehru Cup due to the competition's sponsorship by ONGC, was the 14th edition of the Nehru Cup a friendly tournament organized by the All India Football Federation (AIFF).

The 14th edition of the Nehru Cup International Football Tournament was played in the round-robin league format and the final was held on 31 August. Along with the host nation India, Sri Lanka, Lebanon, Syria and Kyrgyzstan competed in the 15-day tournament at the Ambedkar Stadium in New Delhi .

The total prize money for this tournament was $100,000. The champion team took away a prize of $40,000, the runners-up received $20,000 while the third place team got $10,000.  The Man of the Match received $500 and the winning team of every match received $2000.

All games of the tournament was broadcast live by Zee Sports.

Teams
 Initially the tournament was due to be played by 6 national teams divided into two groups of three teams. The top two in each group would advance to the semi-final stage.  replaced  before being removed from the tournament themselves after they stated their intention to send a reserve side.

Expected Groups

Revised Group

Due to only 5 teams entering, only one group was needed, where each team would play in a  round robin group phase. The top two advanced to a final.

Squads

Venues

Matches and results

Group stage
Teams in green field progress to the Final.

The game between Sri Lanka and Lebanon was called off due to heavy rain. The game and thus proceeding schedule was moved back one day.

Final

Winners

Goalscorers

3 goals:
  Mohamed Izzadeen
  Abdul Fattah Al Agha
  Mohamed Al Zeno

2 goals:
  Baichung Bhutia
  Mirlan Murzaev
  Anton Zemlianuhin
  Ali Al Saadi
  Chathura Maduranga
  Ali Diab

1 goal:
  Sunil Chhetri
  Steven Dias
  Gouramangi Singh
  P. Renedy Singh
  Ildar Amirov
  Rustem Usanov
  Abbas Ahmed Atwi
  Akram Moghrabi
  Mohamad Korhani
  Well Don Ruwanthilaka
  Abdelrazaq Al Hussain

Man of the Match
  Ali Al Saadi IND vs LIB
  Mohamed Al Zeno SYR vs KGZ
  Mohamed Izzadeen SRI vs LIB
  Baichung Bhutia IND vs KGZ
  Abdelrazaq Al Hussain SYR vs SRI
  Anton Zemlianuhin KGZ vs LIB
  Baichung Bhutia IND vs SRI
  Mohamed Al Zeno SYR vs LIB
  Anton Zemlianuhin SRI vs KGZ
  Ali Diab IND vs SYR
  Subrata Pal SYR vs IND, Final

Player of the Tournament
  Baichung Bhutia

References

External links
 Official website

2009
2009 in Asian football
2009–10 in Indian football
2009 in Kyrgyzstani football
2008–09 in Syrian football
2009–10 in Lebanese football
2008–09 in Sri Lankan football